Il marsigliese is a 1975 Italian miniseries produced by Radiotelevisione Italiana. It was directed by Giacomo Battiato and stars Marc Porel as Pierre Toril and Lina Polito as Vicenzina Sannataro.

The miniseries tells about events linked to the fight for the control of cigarette smuggling between the Neapolitan, Sicilian and Marseilles crime families in Naples in the 1970s.

Cast 

 Marc Porel: as Pierre Toril
 Lina Polito: as Vicenzina Sannataro
 Vittorio Mezzogiorno: as Nino Sannataro
 Agla Marsili: as Nino Sannataro's wife
 Patrizio Esposito: as Nino Sannataro's son
 Renato Mori: as Ciccio Navarra
 Isa Danieli: as Maria, Navarra's wife
 Corrado Gaipa: as Tanino Sciacca
 Guido Cerniglia: as the Magistrate
 Nando Murolo: as Vito Amarillo
 Giuseppe Anatrelli: as Pascalino Agnone
 Ida Di Benedetto: as Agnone's wife
 Biagio Pelligra: as the Sicilian killer

External links 

Il marsiliese in Il Davinotti

Italian drama television series
Period television series
1970s Italian television series
Television series about organized crime
Works about the Camorra
Works about the Sicilian Mafia